Frederick Arthur Thomas (born 14 September 1938) is a former wrestler from New Zealand.

He competed at the 1962 British Empire and Commonwealth Games where he won the bronze medal in the men's 82 kg (middleweight) grade.

Thomas competed at the 1960 Summer Olympics in the men's middleweight event.

References

1938 births
Wrestlers at the 1962 British Empire and Commonwealth Games
Commonwealth Games bronze medallists for New Zealand
Olympic wrestlers of New Zealand
Wrestlers at the 1960 Summer Olympics
New Zealand male sport wrestlers
Living people
Commonwealth Games medallists in wrestling
Medallists at the 1962 British Empire and Commonwealth Games